Elias Kristoffersen Hagen (born 20 January 2000) is a Norwegian professional footballer who plays as a midfielder for IFK Göteborg.

Club career
Kristoffersen Hagen made his senior debut for Bodø/Glimt on 13 September 2020 against Odd; Bodø/Glimt won 6–1. January 4th 2023 he was presented as a player for IFK Göteborg.

Career
Kristoffersen Hagen was raised in the youth ranks of Lillestrøm. He was signed by Grorud in 2018 and made his 2nd division debut for the club on 15 April. He played as a starter in the 1-2 win at Hønefoss, where he scored both goals for his team. In the 2019 championship, he contributed to Grorud's promotion to the Norwegian First Division.

In the summer of 2020, Elias Kristoffersen Hagen joined FK Bodø/Glimt. He made his debut in a league match against Odds BK on September 13, 2020. He took over from Victor Boniface and his team scored six goals to one to win the game.

In 2020, he was crowned the Norwegian Champion.

Career statistics

Club

Honours
Bodø/Glimt
Eliteserien: 2020, 2021

References

2000 births
Living people
Footballers from Oslo
Norwegian footballers
Association football midfielders
Norway youth international footballers
Norwegian First Division players
Eliteserien players
Grorud IL players
FK Bodø/Glimt players
IFK Göteborg players